Jenny Jonsson (born 25 June 1977) is a Swedish snowboarder.

She was born in Borlänge. She competed at the 1998 Winter Olympics, in halfpipe.

References

External links 
 

1977 births
Living people
People from Borlänge Municipality
Swedish female snowboarders
Olympic snowboarders of Sweden
Snowboarders at the 1998 Winter Olympics
Sportspeople from Dalarna County
20th-century Swedish women